Indira Tiwari is an Indian actress. She appeared in the Hindi-language films Aarakshan (2011), Nazarband (2020), Serious Men (2020), and Gangubai Kathiawadi (2022).

Career
Tiwari began her acting career by portraying a student in Prakash Jha's 2011 Bollywood movie Aarakshan. She later appeared in four short films: Ekanth, The Manliest Man, Unfair, and Return to Cinder.

In 2020, she starred in Nazarband, directed by Suman Mukhopadhyay and based on a short story by Ashapurna Devi. The same year, she played the female lead alongside Nawazuddin Siddiqui in director Sudhir Mishra's Netflix original Serious Men.

Tiwari has a prominent role in the 2022 film Gangubai Kathiawadi, directed by Sanjay Leela Bhansali and based on the book Mafia Queens of Mumbai by Hussain Zaidi.

Filmography

References

External links
 

Indian film actresses
Living people
Actresses in Hindi cinema
21st-century Indian actresses
Year of birth missing (living people)